Marek Cichosz (June 9, 1979 – May 13, 2012) was a Polish professional racing cyclist.

Career highlights
2007: 3rd, Cyclo-cross Military World Championship

National cyclo-cross championships record

References

External links

1979 births
2012 deaths
Polish male cyclists
Cyclo-cross cyclists
Place of birth missing